The 1960–61 Serie C was the twenty-third edition of Serie C, the third highest league in the Italian football league system.

Girone A

Final classification

Girone B

Final classification

Girone C

Final classification

References and sources
Almanacco Illustrato del Calcio - La Storia 1898-2004, Panini Edizioni, Modena, September 2005

Serie C seasons
3
Italy